The Curve may refer to:
The Curve (1998 film), a thriller/neo-noir film
The Curve (2020 film), a documentary film
The Curve (shopping mall), a shopping mall in Malaysia
The Curve, an African-American district in Memphis, Tennessee, named after a bend in the streetcar line
The Curve, an art gallery within the Barbican Centre, London, UK
Epidemic curve, referred to as "the curve" in discussion of the 2019–20 coronavirus pandemic

See also
Curve (disambiguation)